"Let's Go" is the second single from Pharoahe Monch's 2007 album Desire (Pharoahe Monch album). It was released on September 15, 2006, by SRC Records as a 12" vinyl with a double A-Side. It features singing by MeLa Machinko, a fast-paced guitar-led beat produced by Black Milk, scratches provided by Boogie Blind, and two verses rapped by Pharoahe Monch.

Track listing

A-Side
 "Let's Go (Clean)"
 "Let's Go (Dirty)"
 "Let's Go (Instrumental)"

B-Side
 "Let's Go (Clean)"
 "Let's Go (Dirty)"
 "Let's Go (Instrumental)"

2006 singles
Pharoahe Monch songs